Marie-Florence Candassamy (born 26 February 1991) is a French right-handed épée fencer, 2022 team European champion, and 2016 Olympian.

Medal Record

European Championship

Grand Prix

World Cup

References

External links
 

1991 births
Living people
French female épée fencers
Olympic fencers of France
Fencers at the 2016 Summer Olympics
Universiade medalists in fencing
Place of birth missing (living people)
Universiade gold medalists for France
Universiade bronze medalists for France
Medalists at the 2013 Summer Universiade
20th-century French women
21st-century French women